Lisa Cameron (born 8 April 1972) is a Scottish National Party (SNP) politician and consultant clinical psychologist.  She has been the Member of Parliament (MP) for East Kilbride, Strathaven and Lesmahagow since winning the seat at the 2015 general election. She was re-elected at the 2017 and 2019 general elections.

Cameron was born in Glasgow, and grew up in East Kilbride. She obtained a BSc in Psychology from the University of Strathclyde, an MSc in Psychology and Health from the University of Stirling and a doctorate in Clinical Psychology from the University of Glasgow. Before entering politics, Cameron worked as a clinical psychologist.

Early life and career
Lisa Cameron was born on 8 April 1972 to Campbell McCulloch and Sandra Cameron in Glasgow, Scotland and grew up in Westwood, East Kilbride. Her early education was at South Park Primary School, East Milton Primary School and Duncanrig Secondary School. She attended the University of Strathclyde where she graduated with a BSc. degree in Psychology. Cameron went on to gain an MSc. degree in Psychology and Health from the University of Stirling before gaining her DClinPsy. degree from the University of Glasgow. After her completing her higher education, Cameron specialised in forensic and clinical psychology and worked as a clinical psychologist in the NHS and as an assessor for the Scottish Risk Management Authority.

Cameron voted in favour of Scottish independence at the 2014 Scottish independence referendum. After  the referendum results were announced, in which Scotland voted to remain part of the United Kingdom; she joined the Scottish National Party (SNP). Cameron has also been a trade union representative for Unite for more than a decade.

Parliamentary career
Cameron was selected to contest the East Kilbride, Strathaven and Lesmahagow seat for the SNP at the 2015 UK general election. She received 33,678 votes, with a majority of 16,527 votes over the sitting Labour MP, Michael McCann. The seat and its predecessor, East Kilbride, had been controlled by the Labour Party since 1974.

Cameron was the first clinical psychologist to be elected as an MP to the House of Commons. During the 2015–17 parliament, Cameron was part of the International Development Committee and the International Development Sub-Committee on the Work of the Independent Commission for Aid Impact.

On 5 January 2016, the Scottish Daily Mail published a story which accused Cameron of "hypocrisy" as she owned five ex-council houses which were managed by her husband Mark Horsham, despite campaigning against the sale of council houses at the 2015 general election; she responded to the article by stating that she had been transparent in her property dealings and had declared ownership of the properties per parliamentary rules in her register of interests. Cameron also made a formal complaint about the article to the press regulator Independent Press Standards Organisation (IPSO) citing inaccuracies in the article and intrusiveness of the journalist who had interviewed her at home about the story before its publication. The IPSO did not uphold the complaint and reported that the article had "accurately set out the manner in which the complainant had acquired her properties" and that there was no "intrusion into her private life".

Cameron raised the matter again during the Leveson debate in parliament in May 2018, stating her daughter aged 7 had been spoken to and recorded in her garden by the journalist but this was ignored by IPSO. In his response the Secretary of State for Digital, Culture, Media and Sport agreed to meet with her and her daughter and responded: "This is the sort of thing I am trying to put right".

Cameron retained her seat at the 2017 snap general election with 21,023 votes and both a reduced vote share and a majority of 3,866 votes. Following the election, Cameron was elected to be part of the Health Select Committee and the Commons Reference Group on Representation and Inclusion. She is the chair of the All-Party Parliamentary Groups (APPGs) on Health, Chile, Disability, Dog Advisory Welfare, Psychology, Textile and Fashion and co-chair of the APPG on New Towns. She is also a Vice-Chair on the Pro-Life APPG.

In 2017, Cameron launched the successful Lucy's Law campaign in the House of Commons against puppy farming which became statute in 2019. In 2018, Cameron led the Ivory Bill for the SNP through the House of Commons.

In 2019, Cameron was sent abusive messages and threatened with deselection after voting against legalising abortion in Northern Ireland in a conscience vote. An SNP assessor reportedly said he would recommend anyone with these views should have their application rejected to be a candidate and she should "quit her position as an elected representative."

Cameron was re-elected at the 2019 general election with a majority 13,322. Cameron's majority was the fourth highest in Scotland in 2019.  

On 29 June 2020, Cameron was the only SNP MP to vote on a motion to introduce a Bill to restrict anti-abortion demonstrations near abortion clinics in England. She voted against the motion, submitted on her behalf by the SNP Chief Whip. Cameron then received over 3,000 "thank you notes" from people across Scotland supporting her anti-abortion stance and it was stated that she gave them "a voice in parliament" Following from this vote, she received a death threat and said "freedom of religious belief appears to be being continually eroded".

Cameron was given an Award for Distinguished Contribution to Practice of Psychology by the British Psychological Society in 2020 for her work as a psychologist in NHS Scotland and on mental health in Parliament. Cameron was reportedly given the title in 2021 as SNP Parliamentary Carers Champion for Carers Week.

In June 2021, Cameron brought forward a debate to celebrate Covid-19 Community Champions and commended the work of community organisations and groups across her constituency of East Kilbride, Strathaven and Lesmahagow.

In October 2021, Cameron was also one of the first parliamentarians to support The Disability Employment Charter.

In March 2022, Cameron received the MP of the Year Award from Patchwork Foundation for her disability activism and campaigns against online abuse.

Cameron was awarded the Order of Saint Agatha by the Republic of San Marino in October 2022.

In January 2023, she asked Conservative Scottish Secretary Alister Jack to "intervene" on the Scottish Government's Gender Recognition Reform (Scotland) Bill but to do so in a way that doesn't undermine the devolution settlement. The National swiftly changed their headline and included an insert from this letter.

Personal life
Lisa Cameron has been married to Mark Horsham since 2009, and they have two daughters and live in South Lanarkshire. Cameron's husband is a Councillor in South Lanarkshire and the council's Veteran's Champion. He won an Award as New Councillor of the Year in Scotland 2020.

References

External links
 Personal MP website

 Profile on SNP website

1972 births
Living people
People educated at Duncanrig Secondary School
Alumni of the University of Glasgow
Alumni of the University of Strathclyde
Clinical psychologists
Female members of the Parliament of the United Kingdom for Scottish constituencies
Members of the Parliament of the United Kingdom for Scottish constituencies
People from East Kilbride
Place of birth missing (living people)
Scottish National Party MPs
Scottish psychologists
Scottish women psychologists
UK MPs 2015–2017
UK MPs 2017–2019
UK MPs 2019–present
Alumni of the University of Stirling